Jérémy Ferrari (born 6 April 1985) is a French comedian and radio/television presenter. He is known for his black comedy. In his comedic sketches, he deals with racism, xenophobia, misogyny, and other forms of discrimination.

Biography 
Ferrari grew up in the Ardennes, in the commune of Villers-Semeuse. His parents worked in local shops. In high school, Ferrari dropped out in order to study theatre and comedy in more detail. At a young age, he began to tour and present his first one-man show, De sketches en sketches, and at the age of seventeen, he went to Paris to study in the Cours Florent drama school.

A well-known comedian in France, he shares an on-stage rivalry with comedian Arnaud Tsamère.

Career

Theater 
 De sketches en sketches
 Moi, méchant ?
 Les Wesh
 Deux chaises vides, a play by Bertrand Matthieu, in which he played the poet Arthur Rimbaud
 Mes 7 péchés capitaux
 Hallelujah Bordel ! (released on DVD November 2013)
 Festival d'Avignon
  Festival du Rire 
 La tournée du trio, with Arnaud Tsamere and Baptiste Lecaplain
 Vends 2 pièces à Beyrouth
Anesthésie Générale

Television 
 2005 : Morning Café, M6
 2010 - 2012 : On n'demande qu'à en rire, France 2
 2011 : On a tout révisé, France 2
 2011 : On n'est pas couché, France 2
 2012 - 2013 : ONDAR Show, France 2
 2013 : Présentation de la météo le 11 avril 2013 au Grand Journal
 2013 : Carte blanche à Jérémy Ferrari et Arnaud Tsamère, France 4
 2013 : Touche pas à mon poste !, D8 
 2013 : Le Marrakech du rire 3, M6 (TV channel)
 2014 : L'Émission pour tous, France 2

References

External links

  
  
 

1985 births
Living people
French people of Italian descent
21st-century French male actors
French comedians
French humorists
French male stage actors
French male television actors
French television personalities
French television writers
People from Charleville-Mézières
French male screenwriters
Male television writers